Under Siege is a professional wrestling event held by Impact Wrestling. Since its inception, it is annually held during the month of May, and the first event was held in 2021.

Events

References

External links 
Impact Wrestling

Impact Wrestling pay-per-view events